Farhan Mohamed Ahmed (born 15 November 2000) is a Somali footballer who plays as a forward for Horseed and the Somalia national team.

Club career
As of 2019, Ahmed plays for Horseed.

International career
In April 2018, Ahmed represented Somalia at under-17 level, scoring twice in the 2018 CECAFA U-17 Championship in Burundi, as Somalia reached the final. On 27 July 2019, Ahmed made his debut for Somalia, scoring in a 3–1 loss against Uganda during the 2020 African Nations Championship qualification stage.

International goals
Scores and results list Somalia's goal tally first.

Notes

References

2000 births
Living people
Association football forwards
Somalian footballers
Somalia international footballers